Hugh of Beirut (died 1254) was the Lord of Beirut, the third of his family, from 1247 and by marriage titular Prince of Galilee. His parents were Balian of Ibelin and Eschiva de Montfaucon, daughter of Walter de Montfaucon and Bourgogne de Lusignan of Cyprus.

He married Marie de Montbéliard, titular Princess of Galilee, granddaughter of Walter of Montbéliard, daughter of Odo of Montbéliard, titular Prince of Galilee, and Eschiva of Saint Omer, Princess of Galilee, but had no children.

Christians of the Crusades
1254 deaths
House of Ibelin
Year of birth unknown
History of Beirut
13th-century monarchs in the Middle East